Seyyed Zeyn ol Abedin (also Romanized as Seyyed Zeyn ol ‘Ābedīn) is a village in Siyahrud Rural District, in the Central District of Juybar County, Mazandaran Province, Iran. At the 2006 census, its population was 312, in 77 families.

References 

Populated places in Juybar County